Peeter Tarvel (also Peeter Treiberg; 11 July 1894 Vihula Parish (now Haljala Parish), Wierland County – 19 October 1953 Omsk, Russian SFSR) was an Estonian politician and historian. He was a member of I Riigikogu. He was a member of the Riigikogu since 18 October 1921. He replaced Artur Bach. On 17 October 1922, he resigned his position and he was replaced by Johannes Lehman.

References

1894 births
1953 deaths
People from Haljala Parish
People from Kreis Wierland
Estonian Social Democratic Workers' Party politicians
Estonian Socialist Workers' Party politicians
Members of the Riigikogu, 1920–1923
Members of the Riigikogu, 1923–1926
Members of the Riigikogu, 1932–1934
20th-century Estonian historians
Academic staff of the University of Tartu
Estonian military personnel of the Estonian War of Independence
Gulag detainees